Micropterix lagodechiella is a species of moth belonging to the family Micropterigidae. It was described by Zagulajev in 1987.

References

Micropterigidae
Moths described in 1987
Taxa named by Aleksei Konstantinovich Zagulyaev